During the 2008–09 season, Milan played its 75th Serie A season in the club's existence.

Club

Management

Source: San Siro

Squad

First team

As of December 21, 2008.

Transfers

Winter

Competitions summary

Overall

Serie A

Results summary

Results by round

UEFA Cup - Group E standings

Matches

Updated to games played May 31, 2009.

Pre-season tournaments and friendlies

Serie A

Matches

Coppa Italia

UEFA Cup

Statistics
Competitive matches only. Numbers in brackets indicate appearances made. Updated to games played May 31, 2009.

Players statistics
As of end of the season

Goalscorers

Goals conceded

Games started

References

A.C. Milan seasons
Milan